Michal Pintér (born 4 February 1994) is a Slovak professional footballer who currently plays for the Fortuna liga club ViOn Zlaté Moravce.

ViOn Zlaté Moravce
He made his debut for ViOn Zlaté Moravce against Košice on 25 October 2011.

External links

References

1994 births
Living people
People from Zlaté Moravce
Sportspeople from the Nitra Region
Association football defenders
Slovak footballers
Slovakia youth international footballers
Slovakia under-21 international footballers
FC ViOn Zlaté Moravce players
MFK Tatran Liptovský Mikuláš players
Slovak Super Liga players